Neuenhof may refer to the following places:

In Switzerland
Neuenhof, Aargau, in the Canton of Aargau

In Germany
Neuenhof (Attendorn), a part of Attendorn in the Olpe district, North Rhine-Westphalia 
Neuenhof (Balje), a part of Balje in the Stade district, Lower Saxony
Neuenhof (Eisenach), a part of Eisenach in the Wartburgkreis, Thuringia
Neuenhof (Kircheib), a part of Kircheib in the Altenkirchen district, Rhineland-Palatinate
Neuenhof (Radevormwald), a part of Radevormwald in the Oberbergischer Kreis, North Rhine-Westphalia
Neuenhof (Ruppichteroth), a part of Ruppichteroth in the Rhein-Sieg district, North Rhine-Westphalia
Neuenhof (Windeck), a part of Windeck in the Rhein-Sieg district, North Rhine-Westphalia
Neuenhof Castle, a 17th-century water castle near Lüdenscheid in the Märkischer Kreis, North Rhine-Westphalia